Calamus vitiensis, commonly known as the Dunk Island lawyer vine, solitary lawyer vine or Mission Beach wait-a-while, is a climbing palm in the family Arecaceae. It grows in rainforests from the Maluku Islands east through New Guinea and the Solomon Islands to Fiji and Vanuatu, and south to Queensland, Australia.

Conservation
This species is listed by the Queensland Department of Environment and Science as least concern. , it has not been assessed by the IUCN.

Gallery

References

External links
 
 
 View a map of historical sightings of this species at the Australasian Virtual Herbarium
 View observations of this species on iNaturalist
 View images of this species on Flickriver

vitiensis
Flora of Queensland
Taxa named by Odoardo Beccari
Flora of Indonesia
Flora of Papua New Guinea
Flora of the Solomon Islands (archipelago)
Flora of Fiji
Flora of Vanuatu
Plants described in 1908